= 2017 French elections =

There were two national elections in France in 2017,

- 2017 French presidential election in April–May
- 2017 French legislative election in June
